Mavourneen was billed as a comedy-drama by George H. Jessop and Horace Townsend with music and lyrics by William J. Scanlan (who appeared in the show) and Bartley Campbell.

It was produced in New York on September 28, 1891 at the Fourteenth Street Theatre, and ran until December 25, 1891.

Cast 
The cast included:
Terrence Dwyer: William J. Scanlan
John Dwyer:  Frank Burbeck
Captain Marchmont:  Frazer Coulter
Abbe Maloney: Charles M. Collins  
Shamus Corrigan: Thaddeus Shine
Lady Caroline Dwyer: Helen Tracy
Lady May Tyrrell: Nanette Comstock
Mrs. Dwyer: Emma Maddern Stevens
Georgie Dwyer: Dot Clarendon
Mark: John Findlay
Colonel: Frank Peters
Cusack: J.O. Le Brasse
Kate Morris: Grace Thorne
Susie Morris: Ray Maskell
Katy Morris: Dot Clarendon

Songs 
Based on published sheet music and advertisements in the New York Times, the songs included:
 The Auld Country
 Bye Bye Baby Bye Bye
 The Christmas Tree
 Mavourneen
 Molly O!
 Mrs. Reilly's Party
 Story of the Ould Countre

References

External links

1891 musicals